Events in the year 1960 in Costa Rica.

Incumbents
President: Mario Echandi Jiménez

Deaths
June 1 - Teodoro Picado Michalski

 
1960s in Costa Rica